Saint-François is a provincial electoral district in the Estrie region of Quebec, Canada that elects members to the National Assembly of Quebec. It notably includes parts of the city of Sherbrooke as well as the municipalities of Coaticook and Compton.

It was created for the 1973 election from parts of Compton, Richmond and Sherbrooke electoral districts.

In the change from the 2001 to the 2011 electoral map, it gained territory from Orford and Mégantic-Compton electoral districts, and also gained the Brompton borough of Sherbrooke from Johnson electoral district.

Geography
The Saint-François electoral district covers the following territory:
Barnston-Ouest
Coaticook
Compton  
Dixville
East Hereford
Hatley
Martinville
Sherbrooke - the boroughs of Brompton, Fleurimont, and Lennoxville
Sainte-Edwidge-de-Clifton
Saint-Herménégilde
Saint-Malo
Saint-Venant-de-Paquette
Stanstead-Est
Waterville

Members of the National Assembly

Election results

|}

|-
 
|Liberal
|Monique Gagnon-Tremblay
|align="right"|13,327
|align="right"|46.96
|align="right"|+9.10

|Independent
|François Mailly
|align="right"|210
|align="right"|0.74
|align="right"|
|}

|-
 
|Liberal
|Monique Gagnon-Tremblay
|align="right"|12,528
|align="right"|37.86
|align="right"|

|}

References

External links
Information
 Elections Quebec

Election results
 Election results (National Assembly)
 Election results (Elections Quebec)

Maps
 2011 map (PDF)
 2001 map (Flash)
2001–2011 changes (Flash)
1992–2001 changes (Flash)
 Electoral map of Estrie region
 Quebec electoral map, 2011 

Quebec provincial electoral districts
Politics of Sherbrooke